Dot Allison (born Dorothy Elliot Allison, 17 August 1969, Edinburgh, Scotland) is a Scottish singer and songwriter, known for her contributions to electronic music, most notably as a result of her tenure fronting the band One Dove in the early 1990s. She is married to the film music composer Christian Henson and they live in Edinburgh.

Career
In addition to solo ventures, Allison's career has concentrated on collaborative efforts, and has seen her work beside Scott Walker, Massive Attack, Paul Weller, Hal David, Arab Strap, Mick Harvey, Pascal Gabriel, Kevin Shields, Pete Doherty, Xenomania and Gary Mounfield.

She started her career with Scottish proto-indie-dance outfit One Dove, before she released her debut album, Afterglow, in 1999 to generally positive reviews. A song-oriented pop outing, it was followed by the electro and house music inspired We Are Science in 2002. In 2007, she released Exaltation of Larks. Allison's touring group includes members of The Fall, Tindersticks, The Bad Seeds, Massive Attack, and Tokyo Windbag. Stylistically, her music has been described as "trip-hop". 

Allison released Room Seven and a Half in September 2009. It featured a guest appearance by Pete Doherty on the songs "I Wanna Break Your Heart" and "Portrait of the Sun", which he co-wrote. Paul Weller also appeared on "Love's Got Me Crazy".

She contributed vocals to the track "Without Discord" on the soundtrack to the Channel 4 series Henry 8th: The Mind of a Tyrant, written by Philip Sheppard. Allison was the vocal soloist on the film Triangle, directed by Chris Smith. It opened Frightfest at The London Film Festival in 2009. Allison was also the vocal soloist in the film Black Death, starring Sean Bean, released in May 2010. Allison is the vocal soloist in the film The Devil's Double starring Dominic Cooper, which was due for release in 2011.
Part of Allison's recording of "Message Personnel", a single taken from the Afterglow album, was used in the fourth episode of the sixth series of the sitcom Ideal.
Most recently, Allison wrote the track "Ember", which featured in November 2012 in episode 7 of Channel 4's Fresh Meat alongside Graham Coxon's "Implodium Implodes".

Allison released her fifth solo album Heart-Shaped Scars in July 2021 on SA Recordings.

Discography

With One Dove
 Morning Dove White (1993)

Solo

Albums
 Afterglow (1999)
 We Are Science (2002) produced by Dot Allison, Keith Tenniswood and Dave Fridmann
 Acoustic (2003). Limited release of 200 copies, distributed at Massive Attack gigs in 2003.
 Exaltation of Larks (2007) produced by Kramer
 Room 7½ (2009) – Produced By Rob Ellis and Dot Allison
 Acoustic 2 (2009) Limited released, only available at Dot Allison shows.
 Pioneers 1 – Dot Allison (2012) The first of a collection of the "Pioneers" series on Imagem for Boosey & Hawkes.
 Heart-Shaped Scars (2021)

Singles/EPs
 "Tomorrow Never Comes" / "I Wanna Feel The Chill" (1999)
 "Mo' Pop" (1999) UK No. 81
 "Colour Me" (1999)
 "Message Personnel" (1999)
 "Close Your Eyes" (1999)
 "Substance" (2002) No. 79
 Strung Out (2002) No. 67
 Sampler (2002)
 Beneath the Ivy (2006) 3-song EP produced by Tim Simenon
 Cry (2010)

Remixes albums
 Saint Etienne - How We Used To Live (2000)
 Ruby - Beefheart (2001)

References

External links
 

1969 births
Living people
musicians from Edinburgh
20th-century Scottish women singers
Scottish women songwriters
British women in electronic music
21st-century Scottish women singers
Trip hop musicians